Wabho Town, is a small town in the south Galguduud region of Somalia.
Distance between Wabho and ceelbuur is 43 KM, Wabho and Muqdisho Is 333 KM.

On June 5, 2009, Wabho was the scene of the Battle of Wabho, fought between on one side, rebels of Hizbul Islam and al-Shabaab and on the other side a pro-government militia Ahlu Sunna Waljama'a. With over 123 killed it became one of the heaviest battles in the Somali Civil War.

References
Wabxo
 See an aerial picture of Wabho hier here.

Populated places in Galguduud